Loyalty (also translated as Faith, Truth, Correctness, Faithfulness, or Fidelity), Op. 136 is a cycle of eight ballads for men's chorus a capella composed by Dmitri Shostakovich based upon texts by Yevgeny Dolmatovsky. It was composed in commemoration of the centennial of Vladimir Lenin's birth in 1970.

Shostakovich had contemplated composing a vocal work in tribute to Lenin as early as 1968; by 1969, he announced that he was envisioning a work in oratorio form. A visit to a mass song event in the Estonian SSR that same year helped him to settle on composing Loyalty as an a capella work for men's chorus. He composed it for and dedicated it to choral conductor Gustav Ernesaks, but did not inform him about the work until after it was completed.

Sources conflict as to when and where Loyalty was completed. It was premiered in Tallinn, Estonian SSR on December 5, 1970, with Ernesaks conducting. The work was received warmly in the Soviet Union, but has been mostly ignored and derided elsewhere.

Background
Shostakovich had begun to contemplate composing a work to commemorate the centennial of Lenin's birth as early as December 1968. In a speech he gave at the Fourth All-Union Congress of Composers, he closed by saying:

"It is the duty of all Soviet composers to celebrate this anniversary with dignity. And the best gift for the anniversary will be new beautiful works lauding the image of the beloved leader, the greatness of the achievements of the Soviet people building communism."

In April 1969, Shostakovich announced that he had begun to work on an oratorio. In July of that same year, he visited Estonia and attended the XVII Estonian Song Festival, which closed with a rendition led by Gustav Ernesaks of his setting of Lydia Koidula's "Mu isamaa on minu arm". The performance, which was sung by a choir of children and adults that numbered over 30,000 singers, impressed the composer.

Composition
In March 1970, Shostakovich wrote in an article for Sovietskaya Muzyka:

The life and work of Lenin have always been, are, and always will be an inspiring example for Soviet cultural workers. [...] I am proud that over many years I have witnessed the flourishing of Soviet music, developing under the guidance of the Leninist Communist Party of the Soviet Union. In this historic year, a hundred years on from Lenin's birth, each one of us must look back over the path we have covered, study the present state of Soviet art and make plans for the future. [...] We must produce works which are worthy of our great, immortal leader, Vladimir Lenin.

In preparation for his own musical tribute to Lenin, Shostakovich extensively researched and studied earlier scores dedicated to the Bolshevik leader, including those by Alexander Kastalsky, Vissarion Shebalin, and Mikhail Chulaki. The latter's Lenin With Us, for choir a capella in eight movements, directly influenced the creation of Loyalty. Shostakovich requested new texts for Loyalty from Yevgeny Dolmatovsky, with whom he had collaborated previously on Song of the Forests and The Sun Shines Over Our Motherland, among other works. "Shostakovich suggested that I think about what Lenin means to us," the poet recalled. "We met several times in the silence of his Moscow apartment, sitting together for long periods of time and talking or being silent. That was probably the greatest moment of collaboration, and then, as if to imitate the composer's manner, I wrote down the main points of our conversations in verse and brought them to him."

Dates conflict as to when Loyalty was composed. According to Sofia Khentova, the cycle was begun on February 25 and completed on June 6, 1970, in Repino. The editor of the 1985 complete works edition of the score, Alexander Pirumov, dates the completion of the score to February 13 in the same town. Dolmatovsky and Laurel Fay wrote that Shostakovich completed Loyalty around April 1970 while he was a patient at Gavriil Ilizarov's clinic in Kurgan. In spite of the physical fatigue he felt as a result of medical treatment, the composer worked on Loyalty, the Thirteenth Quartet, and his score to Grigori Kozintsev's film King Lear simultaneously.

Although Loyalty was intended for Ernesaks and dedicated to him, Shostakovich did not inform him that the score was forthcoming. The conductor only learned of the work when the composer messaged him with news of its completion. Surprised, Ernesaks told Shostakovich that he could not prepare a performance in time for the Lenin centennial. Instead, he proposed a premiere at the end of 1970. Shostakovich informed Dolmatovsky of the delay, which disappointed the poet. "But we will be given a first-class performance," the composer said, then added that he was "glad and proud" to have composed the work. He repeated his pride in the work in remarks he gave before the Moscow premiere.

Music

Loyalty consists of eight movements scored for four-part men's chorus:

A typical performance lasts approximately 25 minutes.

Premiere

In late 1970, the score to Loyalty was printed; three of its ballads were also printed in the September issue of Sovietskaya Muzyka. Ernesaks began to rehearse his choir around this time, although he and his singers found the work challenging. Shostakovich arrived in Tallinn a few days before the premiere in order to supervise the rehearsals, which Ernesaks recalled increased tension and nervousness among the choristers:

The preparations were difficult. The high tessitura of the parts demanded especially precise intonation. [...] The musical language of Shostakovich seemed to us too orchestral. [...] The subtlety of the tempo and imagistic contrasts between the movements caused us enormous difficulty. We [...] had not ever polished the work of such a major master in his presence. [...] I listened attentively to [Shostakovich's] words, trying to deduce what remained unsaid. There were a few comments, but all of them were constructive and to the point. And some of them were expressed later, not at the rehearsal, but in casual conversation.

The world premiere of Loyalty took place December 5, 1970, at the Estonia Theatre, with Ernesaks conducting the Estonian State Academic Male Choir. Shostakovich's work shared the program with music by Veljo Tormis, a composer whose music he supported. The performance marked the chorus' 3000th concert. According to Ernesaks, Shostakovich "modestly accepted the audience's enthusiasm" and remarked that in the future he hoped to acquaint himself better with the male choir as an "instrument", which he felt he did not know well enough. "Gustav Ernesaks is a brilliant master," the composer wrote after the world premiere. "I have heard many excellent male choirs, both Soviet and foreign, but the superb ensemble started up by Ernesaks, which recently celebrated its 25th anniversary, is the best of the lot.

Following was the Moscow premiere, which took place on February 25, 1971 with the same performers at the Large Hall of the Moscow Conservatory. The performance was televised and was preceded with spoken remarks by Shostakovich. Ernesaks expressed pleasure with his choir's performance, saying that they "delved more deeply into the meaning of the work."

Reception

Georgy Sviridov wrote an appreciation of Loyalty in Pravda after its Moscow premiere, holding up the cycle's first ballad for especial praise. He described its "background of lingering notes sustained by the tenors, the basses leading into their raspy recitative, typically Russian." He also said that "the composer's new work continues the thread of his art connected with prominent social and political content." Other reviewers also noted the cycle's stylistic connections to other works by Shostakovich.

Reaction to Loyalty outside of the Soviet Union was mixed. Krzysztof Meyer dismissed the work as "another ceremonial work, marked by the lack, apparently intentional, of originality and fresh ideas." In her biography of Shostakovich, Pauline Fairclough described Dolmatovsky's texts as "truly dreadful" and that their "favorable comparisons of Lenin to Confucius, Buddha, and Allah achieved new levels of ludicrous flattery."

In 1997, BMG reissued a selection of Neeme Järvi's early recordings for Melodiya on six compact discs. The conductor wrote in the preface to its liner notes that he had insisted on including Ernesaks' recording of Loyalty in the series:

As we all know, Soviet composers such as Prokofiev and Shostakovich were forced to please their rulers and compose to their directions, but it is indisputable that in spite of this their music often had high artistic qualities. This is one reason why I have chosen Loyalty by Shostakovich for this edition. It is an a capella work, glorifying Lenin, and dedicated to the founding father of Estonian choir music, Gustav Ernesaks and his choir, the Estonian State Academic Male Choir. The choir, founded during the war and led by him, had qualities which no other men's choir could approach—or ever will.

Reviewing the BMG CD, Mark Stryker wrote in the Detroit Free Press that the work's "anthem-like songs" were "curious, but compelling."

In his defense of Loyalty, Gerard McBurney wrote:

Anyone who likes to see Shostakovich in simplified terms as a "secret resister" to the Soviet regime, will have something of a problem with this 20-minute cycle of ballads for unaccompanied male-voice chorus, to maudlin texts by the patriotic poet Dolmatovsky in celebration of the life and work of Lenin. For whatever Shostakovich truly thought about Leninism and Communism and this kind of socialist-realist poetry—and these are matters that will be debated for many years to come—these a capella chorus works cannot easily be dismissed as mere cynical time-serving. However weak their words, these eight choruses are powerful and dramatically impressive essays in Shostakovich’s pared-down late style, with a disturbing sense of genuine grandeur and tragedy, consciously and carefully reinventing the grandeur of 19th century Russian choral-writing to modern ends. Shostakovich was not a religious believer and he wrote no church music. In a strange way, this work is the nearest he came to music of this kind. Perhaps, when the dust of our age has settled, performers will be brave enough to return to this work. For it has something important to tell us beyond the unconvincing message of the words.

Shostakovich was awarded a Glinka State Prize of the RSFSR for Loyalty in 1974.

References

Sources

See also
Symphony No. 2 "To October"
Symphony No. 12 "The Year 1917"
October

Dmitri Shostakovich
Compositions by Dmitri Shostakovich
1970 compositions